Al-Aja'wm is a sub-district located in Hazm al-'Udayn District, Ibb Governorate, Yemen. Al-Aja'wm had a population of 5690 according to the 2004 census.

References 

Sub-districts in Hazm al-'Udayn District